Rita de Cássia de Sousa Guedes (born 2 January 1972) is a Brazilian actress.

Biography 

At 14 Rita joined the theater group Roda Viva, which is developed and presented their work at the Teatro Municipal Catanduva, under the direction of Tabajara Fields. At 17 he moved Catanduva to Campinas, where she soon joined the theater company Mambembe: the Santa Sia. At age 19 she moved to São Paulo.

When the novel opens Despedida de Solteiro saw her career take off, both on television and in theater. Rita Guedes has more than 10 novels, three feature films, seven shorts, more than 10 plays and numerous interests in series, such as Carga Pesada Program and Você Decide.

Filmography

Television

Film

References

External links 

1972 births
Living people
People from Catanduva
Brazilian television actresses
Brazilian film actresses
Brazilian stage actresses
Brazilian expatriates in the United States
Brazilian people of Portuguese descent